Patrick Gallagher (born January 30, 1956) is an American designer and the President and Founder of Gallagher & Associates (G&A), a global museum planning and design firm with offices in Washington, D.C., New York City, San Francisco, and Singapore.

Personal

Gallagher was president of the Society for Environmental Graphic Design (SEGD) from 2000 to 2001. In 2012, he received the SEGD Fellow Award for his contributions to the field of graphic design.  Gallagher is a graduate of Northern Illinois University. He has won industry awards, and his projects have been recognized worldwide.

Gallagher & Associates

Gallagher & Associates' most extensive experience is in masterplanning and creating visitor experiences. Gallagher's work on the International Spy Museum complex, shaped a new model for the museum. G&A was one of the first design firms in the United States to fully plan and execute a for-profit model for a museum, and the International Spy Museum was credited with helping to shape the face of a new downtown area that incorporated a new business model.

Notable projects of G&A include the Grammy Museum at L.A. Live, The Grammy Museum Mississippi, the Shanghai Natural History Museum, The Witte Museum, The National WWII Museum in New Orleans, and the Museum of the Jewish People at Beit Hatfutsot in Tel Aviv, Israel.

Works

See also

Ralph Appelbaum Associates, U.S. firm
Event Communications, U.K. firm
Local Projects, U.S. firm
Cultural tourism
Exhibit design
Exhibition designer

References

External links
 Gallagher & Associates Website

American designers
1956 births
Living people
Place of birth missing (living people)
Museum companies
Museum designers
Exhibition designers